Calytrix acutifolia is a species of plant in the myrtle family Myrtaceae that is endemic to Western Australia.

It blooms between April and December producing white-cream-yellow flowers

Found on dunes, slopes, swampy ground, among rock outcrops and on breakaways on the Swan Coastal Plain and Geraldton Sand Plains where it grows on sandy to loamy soils over granite or laterite.

Initially described as Lhotskya acutifolia by the botanist John Lindley in 1839 in the work A Sketch of the Vegetation of the Swan River Colony it was reclassified into the genus Calytrix in by Lyndley Craven in 1987 in A taxonomic revision of Calytrix Labill. (Myrtaceae) in the journal Brunonia.
 
There is one recognised subspecies; Calytrix acutifolia subsp. acutifolia.

References

Plants described in 1987
acutifolia
Flora of Western Australia